27 is the second extended play by South Korean singer, Kim Sung-kyu. It was released on 11 May 2015. The album release double title tracks as the lead singles, The Answer (너여야만 해) and Kontrol.

Track listing

Awards and nominations

Music program awards

Charts

Album chart

Singles chart

The Answer

Kontrol

Other charted songs

Release history

References

2015 EPs
Korean-language EPs
Woollim Entertainment EPs
Kakao M EPs